Paul Wood (born 1 November 1964 in Saltburn-by-the-Sea) is an English former footballer who played as a right-sided attacking midfielder in the Football League for Portsmouth, Brighton & Hove Albion, Sheffield United and Bournemouth. He played in Hong Kong for Happy Valley and on his return joined Havant & Waterlooville in September 1998, was the club's Player Of The Year in 2001, and retired at the end of the 2002–03 season.

At the end of Portsmouth's home fixture against West Bromwich Albion on 25 October 1986, Wood and teammate Micky Quinn were both ejected from the ground by police officers after being overheard swearing at a linesman during the second half of the game. Chief Inspector David Hanna of Hampshire Constabulary said they would have been ejected at half-time if the incident had happened in the first half.

References

External links 
 

1964 births
Living people
People from Saltburn-by-the-Sea
English footballers
English Football League players
Portsmouth F.C. players
Brighton & Hove Albion F.C. players
Sheffield United F.C. players
AFC Bournemouth players
Andover F.C. players
Happy Valley AA players
Havant & Waterlooville F.C. players
Hong Kong First Division League players
English expatriate footballers
Expatriate footballers in Hong Kong
Footballers from North Yorkshire
Footballers from Yorkshire
Association football midfielders
English expatriate sportspeople in Hong Kong